Sphaeropoeus is a genus of giant pill millipedes belonging to the family Zephroniidae.

Distribution
Species of this genus are present  in North India, Myanmar, Malayan Peninsula, Java, Sumatra and Borneo.

Species
 Sphaeropoeus exstinctus
 Sphaeropoeus extinctus
 Sphaeropoeus gisleni
 Sphaeropoeus glabrus
 Sphaeropoeus hercules
 Sphaeropoeus inermis
 Sphaeropoeus lugubris
 Sphaeropoeus maculatus
 Sphaeropoeus magnus
 Sphaeropoeus malaccanus
 Sphaeropoeus modiglianii
 Sphaeropoeus montanus
 Sphaeropoeus musicus
 Sphaeropoeus pellitus
 Sphaeropoeus politus
 Sphaeropoeus punctulatissimus
 Sphaeropoeus speciosus
 Sphaeropoeus stollii
 Sphaeropoeus sumatrensis
 Sphaeropoeus tatusiaeformis
 Sphaeropoeus tigratus
 Sphaeropoeus tuberculosus
 Sphaeropoeus unciger
 Sphaeropoeus variegatus
 Sphaeropoeus velutinus

References

Millipedes of Asia
Sphaerotheriida
Zephroniidae